Kim Jong-kook (born 8 January 1990) is a South Korean footballer who plays as a midfielder for Chungnam Asan FC in the K League 2.

External links 

1989 births
Living people
Association football midfielders
South Korean footballers
Ulsan Hyundai FC players
Gangwon FC players
Daejeon Hana Citizen FC players
Suwon FC players
Asan Mugunghwa FC players
K League 1 players
K League 2 players